The men's 3000 metres steeplechase event at the 2003 All-Africa Games was held on October 13. Ezekiel Kemboi set a then All–Africa Games record with his time of 8:12.27.

Results

References

3000